Old Town Shamrocks Porvoo Rugby Club, is a Finnish rugby club in Porvoo.

History
The club was founded in 2011.
Seasons 2012 and 2013 the club played in Division 1.
Season 2013 the club lost the final of division 1 but were still promoted since the Finnish championship expanded to 10 teams.
Season 2014 the club finished in 9th place with 2 victories and 7 defeats.
Season 2015 the club finished in 5th place with 4 victories and 4 defeats. Season 2016 the club was eliminated in the semi final by Helsinki RC and in 2017 after finishing the regular season in 3rd place the club faced Jyväskylä RC in semi final and was defeated 58–19.

External links
Old Town Shamrocks Supporters on Facebook
Official pages

Finnish rugby union teams
Sport in Porvoo